How I Survived My Summer Vacation is an anthology novel, consisting of six short stories, based on the U.S. television series Buffy the Vampire Slayer.

Plot summary

Dust
Written by Michelle Sagara West

Buffy continually sees the death of everyone she touches while she heads out to LA to spend summer vacation with her dad. She must come to terms with her own death before the deaths of others will disappear from her mind.

Absalom Rising
Written  by Nancy Holder

Absalom tries to obtain the Master's bones from Giles, who has them kept in his house.

Looks Can Kill
Written by Cameron Dokey

A shapeshifter comes to town.  Giles, Angel and Jenny must deal with it before it gets to the Slayer.

No Place Like...
Written by Cameron Dokey

While shopping in LA, Buffy runs into a fortune-teller who tells her that she's the warrior sent to free the spirit of her dead child. Buffy must solve the mystery of the daughter's death and why her spirit isn't free.

Uncle Dead and the Fourth of July
Written by Yvonne Navarro

A newly risen vampire raises the war veteran General Sam from the grave. General Sam, crazy and still sure that World War II rages on, decides to seize Sunnydale since he believes it has been infiltrated by the enemy. Giles, Jenny and Angel must stop the General and his legion of zombie followers.

The Show Must Go On
Written by Paul Ruditis

Willow and Xander are running a play at the local theater, unaware that the stage crew are vampires who have a love for Shakespeare. After several deaths in a Shakespearian fashion, Giles, Jenny and Angel decide to remove the vampire threat on the night of the play.

Continuity
The stories in this novel are set during the summer break between season 1 and 2.

External links

Reviews
Litefoot1969.bravepages.com - Review of this book by Litefoot
Nika-summers.com - Review of this book by Nika Summers
Shadowcat.name - Review of this book

2000 novels
Books based on Buffy the Vampire Slayer
Fantasy anthologies
Horror anthologies